The Democratic Progressive Party is a political party in Argentina, principally active in Santa Fe.

History 
It was founded by Lisandro de la Torre at the Savoy Hotel in Buenos Aires on December 14, 1914.

In the 1983 election, the Democratic Progressive Party made an alliance with the Socialist Democratic Party by proposing the Formula Martínez Raymonda - René Balestra, obtaining 0.32% of the vote, without obtaining parliamentary representation.

References 

Provincial political parties in Argentina
Political parties established in 1914
Conservative parties in Argentina
1914 establishments in Argentina